Advocate Khandaker Mahbub Hossain (20 March 1938 – 31 December 2022) was a Bangladeshi lawyer and politician. In 1973, he was the chief prosecutor of the court set up to try war criminals under 'Dalal' Act. Served as Bangladesh Supreme Court Bar Association President and Supreme Court Bar Council Vice Chairman. He was known as a criminal law expert in Bangladesh.

Early life and education
Hossain was born on 20 March 1938 in Bamna Upazila of Barguna district. Mahbub received his higher secondary education in Narayanganj. After passing matriculation exams, he studied at Notre Dame College in Dhaka and then at Dhaka University’s law department.

Career 
As a lawyer, Hossain was listed on 31 January 1967. On 20 October of that year, he was enrolled as a High Court Lawyer. In the legal profession, he handled the cases of all the first rank politicians of Bangladesh. Under the 1973 'Dalal' Act, he was the chief counsel of the court set up by war criminals. He served four times as Supreme Court Bar Association President and once as Supreme Court Bar Council Vice Chairman. He actively joined politics in 2008 with the  Bangladesh Nationalist Party. From 2009 to 2016, he was appointed as an advisor to the BNP Chairperson Khaleda Zia and in 2016 as the Vice Chairman of the Central Executive Committee of the BNP. In 2018, he was elected for the Bangladesh Nationalist Party and defeated from Barguna-2 seat in the 11th Bangladeshi general election..

Hossain was arrested for joining the 1952 Language Movement from Narayanganj. He was arrested again during protests against Pakistani ruler Ayub Khan for Bangladesh Liberation. On 5 January 2014, a case was filed against Khandkar Mahbub Hossain at Dhaka's Ramna police station for obstructing police duty. He was arrested in front of the National Press Club in Dhaka on 7 January. He was released on bail by the High Court on 23 January of the same year.

Death
Hossain died on 31 December 2022 at around 10:45 PM while undergoing treatment at Evercare Hospital in Dhaka. He was suffering from infected Covid-19. Later he attacked by Pneumonia. On 31 December 2022, Oxygen level of Khandkar Mahbub Hossain further deteriorated and he was taken to life support.

References 

Bangladeshi lawyers
Bangladesh Nationalist Party politicians
1938 births
2022 deaths